Natural Bridge is an album by American banjoist Béla Fleck, released in 1982. Bela Fleck was a young bluegrass player whose work with such bands as Spectrum and the New Grass Revival pushed the envelope of bluegrass tradition and contributed to the development of the New Acoustic movement spearheaded by mandolinist David Grisman, guitarist Tony Rice, and others. Influenced by Bill Keith and Tony Trischka, he moved the banjo sound much further than anyone could imagine.

Track listing 
All tracks composed and arranged by Béla Fleck
 "Punchdrunk" – 2:39
 "Flexibility" – 4:11
 "Dawg's Due" – 2:59
 "Daybreak" – 3:00
 "Bitter Gap" – 2:59
 "October Winds" – 5:48
 "Crossfire" – 3:26
 "Applebutter" – 2:42
 "Old Hickory Waltz" – 4:53
 "Rocky Road" – 3:24
 "The Natural Bridge Suite" – 6:55

Personnel 
 Béla Fleck – banjo
 Darol Anger - fiddle, violectra
 Sam Bush – fiddle
 Jerry Douglas - dobro
 Jimmy Gaudreau - mandolin
 David Grisman - mandolin
 Mike Marshall - mandolin
 Mark O'Connor - harmony fiddle, 12-string guitar, viola
 David Parmley - guitar
 Mark Schatz - bass
 Ricky Skaggs - 5-string and harmony fiddle
 Buck White - mandolin
Technical
Rich Adler, Robert Schumaker - engineer
David Gahr - front cover photography

References 

1982 albums
Béla Fleck albums
Rounder Records albums